Kevin John Forster (born 27 September 1958) is a male retired long-distance runner from England.

Athletics career
Forster finished 33rd in the marathon at the 1988 Summer Olympics and was the fastest English marathon runner of 1988.

Forster won the Enschede Marathon, the Toronto Marathon and the Stockholm Marathon during his career and had two silver medals from the London Marathon (1984, 2:11:41 and 1988, 2:10:52). He was also a member of the England Cross Country teams competing in the World Cross Country Championships through the 1980s, winning silver team medals in 1982 (Rome) and 1987 (Warsaw). Forster won an individual silver medal in the 1987 European Club championships (Clusone, Milan).

He represented England in the marathon event, at the 1986 Commonwealth Games in Edinburgh, Scotland.

Competition record

References

External links 
 
 
 

1958 births
Living people
Sportspeople from Stockton-on-Tees
English male marathon runners
Olympic athletes of Great Britain
Athletes (track and field) at the 1988 Summer Olympics
Sportspeople from Yorkshire
Athletes (track and field) at the 1986 Commonwealth Games
Commonwealth Games competitors for England